Danilo S. Atienza (April 24, 1951–December 1, 1989) was a Filipino pilot in the Philippine Air Force.

Atienza started out as a Philippine Air Force cadet at Basilio Fernando Air Base in Lipa City, where he was commissioned a second lieutenant in 1974. After assignments with the 5th Fighter Wing at Cesar Basa Air Base, Pampanga, Atienza became Squadron Commander of the 6th Tactical Squadron.

On December 1, 1989, Air Force officers had joined an anti-government revolt. Atienza turned his F-5 fighter against the rebels who established a stronghold at Sangley Field. In bombing and strafing runs, amid heavy rebel ground fire, he and two other combat pilots destroyed one Sikorsky S-76 helicopter, seven T-28's and a fuel depot, depriving the rebel soldiers of air power. This action turned the tide of battle to the government's favor.

However, Atienza lost his life that day. President Corazon C. Aquino awarded him the Medal of Valor. On May 5, 1992, by an act of Congress, the airfield at Sangley Point Naval and Air Training Station was renamed Danilo Atienza Air Base.

References

External links
Bio of Danilo Atienza on Philippine Air Force website

Military history of the Philippines
Philippine Air Force personnel
1951 births
1989 deaths
Aviators killed by being shot down
Recipients of the Philippine Medal of Valor
Armed Forces of the Philippines Medal of Valor
Filipino aviators
Filipino military aviators